Houghton is a small town near Adelaide, South Australia. It is located in the Adelaide Hills, in the City of Tea Tree Gully and the Adelaide Hills Council local government areas between Tea Tree Gully and Inglewood on the North East Road.

History
Houghton was named after the town of Houghton-le-Spring, Durham, England.

The 162-hectare Highercombe estate was settled by George Anstey in 1841, who named it after his original family home near Dulverton, Somerset. The present-day Highercombe golf course south of the townsite was part of this estate. In 1857, the house, now with sixteen rooms, and estate was purchased by George Waterhouse, who became Premier of South Australia in 1861. In 1929, it was burnt in a fire, but was rebuilt on a smaller scale.

The townsite itself was also settled in 1841, by land agent and auctioneer John Richardson. During the 1840s, it was the hub of the district and gained a simple stone Union Chapel serving several denominations, the Travellers' Rest Hotel, blacksmith, school, dwellings and other trappings of civilisation, together with a reserve which is now Houghton Common.

Geography
Houghton is located between Tea Tree Gully and Inglewood at the intersection of North East Road and Lower North East Road. The ABS 2001 census found 438 people living in 151 dwellings.

Facilities
The area has a few small shops, the Highercombe Golf Course, and a primary school (which has now closed due to lack of numbers) and oval. It backs onto the Anstey Hill Recreation Park which is accessible from nearby Vista.

Transport

The area is not serviced by Adelaide public transport. A coach is operated from Tea Tree Plaza Interchange to Gumeracha and Mount Pleasant by Affordable Coachlines.

References 

Suburbs of Adelaide